Belmont is a census-designated place (CDP) in Loudoun County, Virginia, United States. The population as of the 2010 United States Census was 5,966.

The Belmont CDP is situated along the east side of Belmont Ridge Road (State Route 659) between State Route 7 and State Route 267 (the Dulles Toll Road). The CDP extends north to VA 7 and south to include Middlebury Street and the Washington and Old Dominion Trail, while to the east it is bordered by Stubble Road, Claiborne Parkway, and Ashburn Road. Two major subdivisions make up Belmont: Belmont Country Club in the east is the larger of the two, and Belmont Greene, in the west, is the smaller.

The area drains mainly east via several streams toward Broad Run, a north-flowing tributary of the Potomac River, while the westernmost part of the CDP drains west to Goose Creek, which also flows north to the Potomac.

References

Census-designated places in Loudoun County, Virginia
Washington metropolitan area
Census-designated places in Virginia